Radio Broadgreen is a hospital radio station based within Broadgreen Hospital in Liverpool, England.

How It Began

Radio Newsham
Radio Broadgreen actually began at Radio Newsham in the late 1970s.
Radio Newsham then approached the administration of Broadgreen Hospital to set up and operate a service for the patients at the Broadgreen site.

The new hospital radio station at Broadgreen Hospital was given the go-ahead and broadcasts began in October 1983.

The Grand Opening
The official Radio Broadgreen opening took place on 19 October 1983 with the Lord Lieutenant A.E. Stoddart.

Liverpool Hospitals Broadcasting Service
When the opportunity arose to broadcast from both sites, Radio Newsham was renamed to Liverpool Hospital Broadcasting Service to reflect the fact that Liverpool Hospital Broadcasting Service had 2 stations broadcasting under its wing.

Initially, programmes were produced at both stations with some presenters doing one show a week at each hospital.

Both of these hospital radio stations broadcast in harmony until 1988 when a dwindling patient population and the need to cut costs left the Liverpool Area Health Authority with no option but to close down Newsham General Hospital and with it Radio Newsham.

That left Radio Broadgreen as the new base of the Liverpool Hospital Broadcasting Service.

Radio Broadgreen's Permanent Base
In 1997, after 13 years of broadcasting within the hospital building itself, the old caretakers lodge house within Broadgreen Hospital was given to Radio Broadgreen for the station to use as its permanent base. To this day, Radio Broadgreen is still broadcasting live from the old caretakers lodge house.

Shows Broadcast
Each day, Radio Broadgreen broadcast live shows dedicated to every type of music. These include specialist country music shows; music from the pre war era, 50s, 60s and 70s shows; folk music, rock music, pop music shows and every day they broadcast any requests received as well as live commentaries of Everton FC and Liverpool FC home fixtures.

A live stream of programme output (except during live sports commentary) is available to listen to via their website.

Fundraising
With Radio Broadgreen being a registered charity, they rely on donations to keep themselves afloat.

These events range from bag packing events to sponsorship deals for adverts or shows by local companies.

Slogans

Volunteers

Radio Broadgreen is staffed wholly by volunteers who spend a minimum of 2 hours a week producing/presenting their own shows. All staff also spend time around the hospital gathering requests and interacting with the patients of the hospital that receive the hospital radio service.

See also
 Hospital Broadcasting Association

External links 
 
 Hospital Radios' Football Network

Hospital radio stations
Radio stations in Liverpool
1983 establishments in England
Radio stations established in 1983